Dorothy I. Hokr (June 22, 1923 – March 26, 1998) was an American homemaker and politician.

Born in The Bronx, New York City, New York, Hokr grew up in Miami, Florida. In 1964, Hokr, her husband Leroy "Lee", and the family moved to Minnesota. Hokr was a homemaker and in the real estate business. She served on the New Hope, Minnesota, city council from 1976 to 1981. From 1981 to 1985, Hokr served in the Minnesota House of Representatives and was a Republican. In 1988, Hokr and her husband moved to The Villages in Lady Lake, Florida. Hokr served as president of The Villages Property Owners Association. Hokr died of cancer in Lady Lake, Florida.

Notes

1923 births
1998 deaths
Politicians from the Bronx
People from Lake County, Florida
People from New Hope, Minnesota
Businesspeople from Minnesota
Women state legislators in Minnesota
Minnesota city council members
Republican Party members of the Minnesota House of Representatives
20th-century American women politicians
20th-century American politicians
Women city councillors in Minnesota
20th-century American businesspeople